San Win is a Burmese name and may refer to:

 San Win (painter) (1905–1981)
 San Win (historian) (1947–2021), Burmese historian and archaeologist
 San Win (politician), Burmese Minister of Commerce 1974–1976